{{Infobox mountain
| name = Tassemitⴰⴷⵔⴰⵔ ⵏ ⵓⴽⵍⵉⵎ تاصميت
| photo = Jbel Tassemit .jpg
| photo_caption = 
| elevation_m = 2205
| elevation_ref = 
| prominence_m = 
| prominence_ref = 
| range = High Atlas
| parent_peak = 
| map = Morocco#Africa
| map_caption = Location in Morocco
| label = Tassemit
| label_position = bottom
| location = Béni Mellal-Khénifra, Morocco
| coordinates = 
| coordinates_ref = 
| type = 
| first_ascent = Unknown
| easiest_route = From Irhelrher, Azilal Province
}}
Tassemit or Jbel Tassemit'', is a mountain of the Béni Mellal-Khénifra region of Morocco. Its altitude is 2,205 m.

It is in the High Atlas not far from Beni Mellal, Beni Mellal Province.

See also
High Atlas

References

Mountains of Morocco
Geography of Béni Mellal-Khénifra